Law of Fear is a 1928 American silent western film directed by Jerome Storm and starring Sam Nelson and Albert J. Smith.

Cast
 Ranger the Dog as Ranger, a Dog 
 Jane Reid as Marion 
 Sam Nelson as Bud Hardy 
 Albert J. Smith as Steve Benton / The Hunchbacked Masked Bandit 
 Ida Lewis

References

Bibliography
 Munden, Kenneth White. The American Film Institute Catalog of Motion Pictures Produced in the United States, Part 1. University of California Press, 1997.

External links
 

1928 films
1920s action films
American silent feature films
American action films
American black-and-white films
Films directed by Jerome Storm
Film Booking Offices of America films
1920s English-language films
1920s American films
Silent action films